Kevin Insik Hahn is a South Korean physicist who is an expert in the fields of nuclear physics and nuclear astrophysics. Since December 2019, he has been the director of the  Center for Exotic Nuclear Studies at the Institute for Basic Science (IBS) in South Korea.  He also holds an endowed professorship in the Department of Science Education at Ewha Womans University, where he has worked since 1999. In his research, he has worked on accelerator-based as well as non-accelerator-based experiments. His current research activities involve a number of accelerators around the world, including the RI Beam Factory (RIBF) at RIKEN, Relativistic Heavy Ion Collider (RHIC) at Brookhaven National Laboratory, and the soon-to-open Rare isotope Accelerator complex for ON-line experiment (RAON). During his tenure at Ewha Womans University, he promoted STEM/STEAM education by serving for multiple years as the director of the Advanced STEAM Teacher Education Center. He also wrote several physics textbooks for high school students and undergraduate students.

Education
Hahn obtained a B.S. in physics from University of California, Los Angeles (UCLA) in 1984. He then enrolled in Yale University and graduated with a M.S. in physics in 1989 and a Ph.D. in nuclear astrophysics in 1993. His doctoral thesis was on the reaction rates of 17F(p,γ)18Ne and 14O(α,p)17F and was supervised by Peter Parker.

Career
Hahn went to Caltech and worked for three years as a research fellow in the Kellogg Radiation Laboratory with Ralph Kavanagh. Relocating to Japan, he spent the next two years as a research fellow at RIKEN becoming an official RIKEN Fellow from 1996–1997. As a Fellow, he worked with Ishihara at the Radiation Laboratory at RIKEN and also worked closely with Motobayashi and Kubono. The next year he worked as a research professor in the University of Houston teaching an undergraduate course on electromagnetism and conducted hypernuclear experiments at Brookhaven National Laboratory and rare decay experiments. From 1999, he worked as a professor in the Department of Science Education, Ewha Womans University, Korea including as an invited chair professor. From 2014, he has worked as a visiting scholar with RAON and the IBS Center for Underground Physics where he worked with KIMS (dark matter search), AMoRE (double beta decay experiment), and the HPGe Array.

Working mainly on silicon detector for the PHENIX collaboration, he and collaborators found evidence of the quark–gluon plasma, which can be made in small-scale collision systems. Working with colleagues,  he participated in experiments confirming atomic nuclei with 34 neutrons are more stable than expected. Earlier experiments theorized this but had been unable to confirm it.

In late 2019, Hahn became the founding director of the IBS Center for Exotic Nuclear Studies. Divided into four groups; experimental nuclear astrophysics, experimental nuclear structure, experimental nuclear reaction and theoretical nuclear physics, research of the center uses rare isotope beams from overseas RI accelerators and later the Rare Isotope Science Project's (RISP) RAON accelerator in Korea, specifically RISP's KOrea Broad acceptance Recoil spectrometer and Apparatus (KOBRA) with a focus on discovering rare isotopes and investigating the origins of heavy elements. His work will help direct collaborations among universities and research groups studying rare isotope accelerator sciences in South Korea.

Awards and honors
2018: Outstanding faculty in research, Ewha Womans University
2017: Outstanding faculty in research, Ewha Womans University
2006: Outstanding faculty in research grant, Ewha Womans University
1996-1997: RIKEN Fellow
1993-current: Member, American Physical Society

Committee work
2019: International Advisory Committee for the 15th Symposium on Origin of Matter and Evolution of Galaxies (OMEG), Kyoto, Japan
2018–present: Board member of the RAON Users Association
2017: International Advisory Committee for the Symposium on Origin of Matter and Evolution of Galaxies (OMEG), Daejeon, Korea
2015-2016: Board member of the Korean Physical Society
2014-2018: Board member of Asian Nuclear Physics Association (ANPhA)
2013–present: Member of the RISP Scientific Program Advisory Committee

Selected publications

References

External links
Research Centers - Center for Exotic Nuclear Studies
 Applied Nuclear Physics Lab

South Korean physicists
University of California, Los Angeles alumni
Yale University alumni
Academic staff of Ewha Womans University
California Institute of Technology faculty
Riken personnel
University of Houston alumni
Living people
Nuclear physicists
Institute for Basic Science
1962 births
South Korean scientists